Aliena Schmidtke (born 20 November 1992) is a German swimmer. She competed in the women's 100 metre butterfly event at the 2017 World Aquatics Championships. She is a member of the German National Team.

Life and education 
Schmidtke was born on 20 November 1992 in Bad Segeberg, Germany. She was attended Ohio State University. Schmidtke earned a Bachelor of Science degree in molecular genetics and biology in Ohio State University. Volunteered as a swim instructor with underprivileged children in the Columbus, Ohio area.

References

1992 births
Living people
German female swimmers
Place of birth missing (living people)
Universiade medalists in swimming
Universiade gold medalists for Germany
German female butterfly swimmers
Medalists at the 2017 Summer Universiade